Hannevika or Hannevig / Hannevik is a neighbourhood in the city of Kristiansand in Agder county, Norway. It is located in the borough of Grim and in the district of Tinnheia. The neighborhood is located along the European route E39 highway and the start of Norwegian County Road 456. Hannevika is a large industrial area. Glencore and Hennig-Olsen Iskremfabrikk are the two largest industries located there. Hannevika is located southeast of Eigevannskollen, northeast of Kartheia, and south of Kolsberg.

Transportation

Hannevika is an important place for bus lines in Kristiansand, as it is a place to change bus for many.

References

Geography of Kristiansand
Neighbourhoods of Kristiansand